Achmad Hasyim Muzadi (8 August 1944 – 16 March 2017) was an Indonesian Islamic scholar and cleric who served as chairman of the Nahdlatul Ulama, from 1999 to 2010. The founder and director of the Al-Hikam Islamic boarding school, he was a proponent of moderate Islam, which he defined as being neither radical nor liberal, and criticized both Islamic fundamentalism and Islamic liberalism. Hasyim was the vice presidential running mate of President Megawati Sukarnoputri in the 2004 Indonesian presidential election, though the ticket was defeated in a runoff. He subsequently served in the Presidential Advisory Council from 2015 until his death.

Early life and education 

Hasyim was born on 8 August 1944 in Tuban, East Java, then occupied by Japan. His father's name was Muzadi and his mother's Rumyati. He attended various Islamic schools, including a pesantren, an Islamic boarding school, in Gontor, Ponorogo Regency. He obtained a college degree in tarbiyah (Islamic education) from the State Islamic Institute of Malang in 1969.

As Islamic cleric and scholar

Al-Hikam Islamic boarding school 
He founded the Al-Hikam Islamic boarding school (pesantren) in Lowokwaru, Malang, East Java, in March 1992. The pesantren provided a college-level mix of general and Islamic education. The school was small, with 125 students by 2000, but according to Islamic scholar and anthropologist Ronald A. Lukens-Bull it seemed "an innovative and forward-thinking approach" to shaping the future of Indonesia.

According to Hasyim, who was also Al-Hikam's director, the school was aimed at Muslims with non-religious majors whose knowledge and practice of Islam was lacking. Hasyim saw this group as susceptible to fundamentalism, which viewed tradition and modernity to be antagonistic, and he founded Al-Hikam to curb its growth among college students.

Nahdhlatul Ulama and other organizations 
Hasyim was active in Nahdlatul Ulama (NU), the largest Islamic organization in Indonesia, from the 1960s onwards. From 1992 to 1999 he was the chairman of NU's regional chapter in East Java. In 1996, Hasyim was inducted as a khalifa (deputy) of the Qadiri-Naqshbandi Sufi order. In 1999, he was elected the Chairman of NU, replacing Abdurrahman Wahid who became the fourth President of Indonesia. Hasyim held the Chairman position for two terms, until 2010 when he could not run again because of term limit. In 2004, he co-founded the International Conference of Islamic Scholars with Hassan Wirajuda, an Indonesian diplomat and former foreign minister. This conference held interfaith dialogues and meetings, and was intended to improve relations between Islamic and Western communities after the September 11 attacks. During the War in Afghanistan (2001–present), he rejected calls to recruit NU members to fight a jihad against the United States-led coalition.

Political career
Hasyim started his political career as a member of the city-level parliament of Malang for the United Development Party (PPP, an Islamist party that had begun as a coalition of four parties in opposition to the Suharto government). In 1986, he was elected a member of East Java's Regional People's Representative Council (DPRD), a provincial-level parliament.

In 2004, he was the running mate of the incumbent president Megawati Sukarnoputri in Indonesia's first direct presidential election. The ticket won 26.2% of the votes in the first round of elections, which was a second-place finish, and forced a runoff election, but Hasyim and the incumbent president lost to Susilo Bambang Yudhoyono and Jusuf Kalla in the runoff.

In the 2014 presidential election, he joined the campaign team of Joko Widodo who was later elected president. From 2015 until his death, he was appointed a member of President Widodo's , holding the portfolio of People's Welfare.

Views 
Hasyim was a proponent of moderate Islam, which he defined as being neither radical nor liberal. Fighting Islamic fundamentalism was one of his goals in founding Al-Hikam. The organization has identified students who harbor "strong religious sentiments but who have yet to receive solid religious training" as being "particularly susceptible to fundamentalism". It views the traditional teaching of pesantren and historical interpretations of the great Islamic scholars as tempering factors to combat extremism.

On the other hand, Hasyim disagreed with liberal Islam because of its tendency to "permit (make halal) all things", and criticized the youth of NU for being "more like Westerners in viewing Islam and tradition" because of their Western funding and training. Despite the disagreement, he did not call for liberal thought to be banned, and said that proper forums must be had to debate controversial issues in the community.

During the US invasion of Afghanistan in the wake of the September 11 attacks, Hasyim rejected calls in Indonesia to recruit members of NU for a jihad in Afghanistan. According to him, "jihad does not always mean holy war; efforts to develop Islam and the Muslim ummah are also called jihad". He said that the September 11 attacks were a "tragedy of humanity, not a tragedy of religion" and should not be turned into a religious conflict.

Illness and death 
In January 2017, the 72-year old Hasyim suffered from exhaustion after he had traveled to several places in Indonesia, directly after his return from a trip to Australia. He was treated at the Lavalette Hospital in Malang 6–17 from January, and then discharged in a stable condition. On 11 March, he was readmitted to the hospital. He was discharged on 13 March because he had chosen to recover at his house, against the recommendation of the hospital. The President of Indonesia Joko Widodo flew to Malang to visit him on 15 March. Hasyim died on 16 March on 06.15 Western Indonesian Time at his residence in the compound of the Al-Hikam Islamic boarding school.

He was buried on that same day at the second campus of Al-Hikam in Depok, West Java. Vice President of Indonesia Jusuf Kalla led the funeral procession. Hasyim's body was escorted by military and police personnel, members of Islamic organisations, and students of Al-Ihram in a military-style funeral starting at 16.15, local time.

References

Citations

Sources 

 
 
 
 
 

1944 births
2017 deaths
People from Tuban
Indonesian politicians
Indonesian Islamic religious leaders
20th-century Muslim scholars of Islam
Indonesian Muslims
Indonesian Sunni Muslims
Nahdlatul Ulama
Sunni Muslim scholars of Islam